The 1990 NCAA Division I-AA Football Championship Game was a postseason college football game between the Georgia Southern Eagles and the Nevada Wolf Pack. The game was played on December 15, 1990, at Paulson Stadium in Statesboro, Georgia. The culminating game of the 1990 NCAA Division I-AA football season, it was won by Georgia Southern, 36–13. It was the second consecutive Division I-AA title, and fourth overall, for Georgia Southern.

Teams
The participants of the Championship Game were the finalists of the 1990 I-AA Playoffs, which began with a 16-team bracket. The location of the final, the Georgia Southern Eagles' Paulson Stadium, had been predetermined via a three-year agreement the university reached with the NCAA in February 1989.

Georgia Southern Eagles

Georgia Southern finished their regular season with an 8–3 record, with one of their losses coming against Florida State of Division I-A. Ranked third in the final NCAA I-AA in-house poll and seeded third in the tournament, the Eagles defeated The Citadel, Idaho, and UCF to reach the final. This was the fifth appearance for Georgia Southern in a Division I-AA championship game, having three prior wins (1985, 1986, and 1989) and one prior loss (1988).

Nevada Wolf Pack

Nevada finished their regular season with a 10–1 record (7–1 in conference); their only loss was an away game against Boise State. Ranked fourth in the final NCAA I-AA in-house poll and seeded fourth in the tournament, the Wolf Pack defeated Northeast Louisiana, Furman, and Boise State to reach the final. Both the Furman and Boise State games went to triple overtime. This was the first appearance for Nevada in a Division I-AA championship game.

Game summary

Scoring summary

Game statistics

References

Further reading

External links
 1990 I-AA National Championship - Nevada vs Georgia Southern via YouTube

Championship Game
NCAA Division I Football Championship Games
Georgia Southern Eagles football games
Nevada Wolf Pack football games
Sports competitions in Georgia (U.S. state)
American football in Georgia (U.S. state)
NCAA Division I-AA Football Championship Game
NCAA Division I-AA Football Championship Game